Hakuninmaa (Finnish), Håkansåker (Swedish) is a quarter of Helsinki, Finland.

Hakuninmaa is a neighbourhood in Kaarela. It's located next to Kannelmäki and Maununneva.

Kehä 1 and Hämeenlinnanväylä are two of the biggest motorways near Hakuninmaa.

There's kindergarten in Hakuninmaa called "Päiväkoti Hakuninmaa".

Hakuninmaa is famous for its beautiful forests, especially the area near Paloheinä.

Nicknames for Hakuninmaa:
Håkansåker (Swedish)
Hakuninmaa (Finnish)
Hakkari (Slang)

Neighbourhoods of Helsinki